The 2007–08 Minnesota Golden Gophers men's basketball team represented the University of Minnesota in the college basketball season of 2007–2008. The team's head coach, Tubby Smith began his first year at Minnesota after leaving Kentucky in March 2007. The Golden Gophers played their home games at Williams Arena in Minneapolis, Minnesota and are members of the Big Ten Conference.

Season
On March 7, 2007, it was announced that Tubby Smith would be leaving Kentucky after ten years to coach at Minnesota.  Smith still had 4 years left on his contract, but elected to sign on for seven years with the Golden Gophers.  The season was highlighted with a run in the Big Ten tournament, where the Gophers defeated Northwestern in the first round, then shocked Indiana with a last second, miraculous jump shot by Blake Hoffarber to advance to the semifinals.  Blake's shot earned him the second ESPY nomination of his career.  Minnesota would then lose to Illinois and be selected as a #4 seed in the National Invitation Tournament, where they made a first round exit on their home court.

Roster

2007–08 Schedule and results

|-
! colspan="6" style="text-align: center; background:#800000" | Exhibition 

|-
! colspan="6" style="text-align: center; background:#800000"|Regular Season

|-
! colspan="6" style="text-align: center; background:#800000"|Big Ten Regular Season 

|-
! colspan="6" style="text-align: center; background:#800000"|2008 Big Ten tournament 

|-
! colspan="6" style="text-align: center; background:#800000"|2008 National Invitation tournament

Rankings

The 2007–08 Minnesota Golden Gophers basketball team was not ranked during the season.

References

Minnesota Golden Gophers men's basketball seasons
Minnesota
Minnesota
2007 in sports in Minnesota
2008 in sports in Minnesota